Chari is a Hindu Brahmin surname that encompasses various communities across India, with regional modifications as consistent with the local languages. Notable people with this surname include:
Ahalya Chari (1921–2013), Indian educationist
Brian Chari (born 1992), Zimbabwean cricketer
 C. T. K. Chari (1909–1993), Indian philosopher
Deepa Chari, Indian actress and swimsuit model
Emmanuel Chari, (born 1975) Zimbabwean born Author and Actor 
Nyasha Chari (born 1980), Zimbabwean cricketer
Raja Chari (born 1977), Indian-American astronaut
Seshadri Chari, Indian journalist, politician and foreign policy analyst
 V. V. Chari (born 1950s), Indian-born economist
Vyjayanthi Chari, Indian–American Mathematician
Tulshidas Dattaram Chari, (born 1954), Goan Artist 
Siddhanth Chari, (born 1969), Indian-born aviator
(Stone sculptures, wood carvings, Ganesh idols, black smith, paintings, wax candles moulds, steel work, fibreglass work, etc.)

Chari- Vishwakarma or Panchal Brahmins of Goa/Konkan.

Goa is also known as the Konkan Kashi, one of the important place in India. Present boundaries of it spread from Pedne to Canacona talukas. But in olden days it was stretched from Achra River  to Gngavalli river.

Chari ('च्यारी/चारी') is a community of artist in Goa and Konkan. They are the traditional Hindu carpenter in Goa. In this community every person has the surname as Chari.

Chari belong to Panchal Brahmans which is also known as Viswakarma Brahmins. They were also called as 'Shivabrahman'. 'Saiyadri Khanda' of 'Scanda Puran'- puran that gave Puranic importance of Goa says artist of ancient Goa were called as 'Shaivagayatri Brahmins'. Those Chari who fled Goa during Portuguese time to prevent them being getting converted to Christianity & settled in Solapur district are still known as 'Shiva Brahma Sutar'
Since Chari are traditional carpenters of Goa their main occupation is carpentry. They do smithery also. In fact, they are master in most of the technical work; so they are also referred as a borne engineers.

Traditionally caste wise Panchal Brahmin of Goa Categorized in 3 different castes. They are Vishwakarma Brahmin Chari, Daivadnya Brahmin or Sonar & Twasta Brahmin or Kasar Community. But currently daivadnya doesn't consider themselves under Vishwakarma.

Different names of Chari popular in Goa.
Chari were known with the different names since ancient Times. Following are some of the name.
Acharya- Meaning teacher of religion. Today it changed Acharya-Achari-Chari.

Mest/Mestri -At many place where  Chari stays is known as Mestawado. There is Mestawado in Panchwadi, Mandre, Vasco, Betoda, Kurti, Usgaon etc. In Goa there are places in known as Mestbhat in Mershi & Madgaon.

Kumbhar - The word Kumbar is derived from the Sanskrit word  meaning pillar. A good pillar carver is called Kumbar. At some places in Goa there are paddy field Qumarachi Namshi allotted to old Chari resident.

Shiva Brahmin - Chari was called Shaiva Brahmin in Goa during ancient times. Skanda Purana antargat Sahyadri Khanda refers artist of Goa as Shivagaytri Brahmin.

Sutar - The word Sutar has derived from the word Sutradhar. There are Sutarwado at many places in Goa.

Vinani - Vinani in old Konkani meaning blacksmith and was adhered to Chari. There are lands allotted by the Gaunkari to Chari in many of the villages of Goa with the name Vinani.

Zo Ferrieiro - All the Portuguese documents refers Chari with surname as Zo Ferreiro. The word Ferreiro has been derived from Latin  meaning blacksmith. Zo can be from the word Oja. Zo word got corrupted from Oja-OJo-Zo.

Culture  and religion
Chari are predominantly Devi worshipers. The village where they settled they accepted village deity as their family deity. Chari are followers of Shiva. Being a shaiva or follower of Shiva they are called 'adave' in local language. In olden times they were referred as Shaiva Brahmins. Even the Sahyadri Khanda of Scanda Purana has the reference of it. They worship Vishwakarma since they have descended from him. Chari are Shaiva still their main community deity is 'Shree Ragunath (Ram)' of Gimoney. This temple has history of more than 500 years. It was destroyed by Moghal aggression in 1684 by Shaijada Shaha Alam.  Chari reconstructed it. They have Shree Ram's temples at Mayade & Vasco. Also the main goddess to whom every Vishwakarma people worships is Kalika or Kalamba. Her temple is situated at & Merce Goa & Ancola in Karnataka where she is known as Kallama. The main temple is situated at Shirsangi at Belgaum district of Karnataka.

See also

Cari (name)
Char (name)
Chara (given name)
Charl (name)
Charo (name)